is a city in Okinawa Prefecture, Japan, located on the Miyako Islands. As of 2012, it had a population of 54,908. The current mayor is Kazuyuki Zakimi, who took office on January 25, 2021.

History 

The modern city of Miyakojima was established on October 1, 2005, from the merger of the old city of Hirara, the towns of Gusukube, Irabu and Shimoji, and the village of Ueno (all from Miyako District). As a result of the merger, Miyako District only has one remaining village.

Geography 
Since the city was created by merging several towns that were located on different islands, the city of Miyakojima consists of multiple islands. The islands administered by the city include:
 Miyako-jima
 Ikema-jima
 Ōgami-jima
 Irabu-jima
 Shimojishima
 Kurima-jima
Several of the islands are connected by bridge.

 Miyako-jima and Ikema-jima
 Miyako-jima and Kurima-jima
 Miyako-jima and Irabu-jima
 Irabu-jima and Shimojishima: connected by six bridges (they are very close together)

Ogami-jima is the only island that is not connected by bridge and must be reached by boat.

Demographics 
As of December 2012 the city has an estimated population of 54,908 and a population density of 268.45 per km2. The total area is 204.54 km2. The city had 24,728 households. This makes it the ninth-largest city in Okinawa Prefecture.

Government

National government 
The city, along with the cities of Ishigaki, Itoman, and Tomigusuku, lies in Okinawa 4th district, which elects one representative to the House of Representatives (lower house). The current representative is Kosaburo Nishime of the Liberal Democratic Party. The entire prefecture of Okinawa elects two representatives (one each three years) to the House of Councillors (upper house). The current representatives are:

 Yōichi Iha (member of the Okinawa Whirlwind Party). First elected in 2016, term ends in 2022.
 Tetsumi Takara (member of the Okinawa Whirlwind Party). First elected in 2019, term ends in 2025.

Prefectural government 

The city forms most of the "Miyakojima constituency" (along with Tarama island) and elects two members to the Okinawa Prefectural Assembly. Representatives are elected for a term of 4 years.

Local government

Mayor 
The current mayor of Miyakojima is Kazuyuki Zakimi (born 1949). He took office on January 25, 2021, after defeating the incumbent Toshihiko Shimoji (born 1945) on the January 17, 2021 election. Zakimi was endorsed by the Constitutional Democratic Party and the Japanese Communist Party, while Shimoji was endorsed by the Liberal Democratic Party and Komeito.

Previous mayors of the city (since the 2005 merger) include:

 Akira Ishimine (2005–08). Resigned due to scandal.
 Toshihiko Shimoji (2008–21). Defeated in election.

City council 
The Miyakojima City Council consists of 24 people. Most formally register as independent but are members of a caucus.

Number of members by formal party affiliation:

 Independent/no affiliation: 20
 Japanese Communist Party: 1
 Komeito: 2
 Liberal Democratic Party: 1

Transportation
The city of Miyakojima is served by two airports. Miyako Airport (MMY), the main commercial airport, is located on Miyako Island; and Shimoji Airport, initially a private field, is now a Class 3 facility operated by the prefectural government located on Shimojishima. This nearby island is close enough to be connected by a causeway bridge to the larger Miyako Island.

Economy
Agriculture and livestock are the core financial industries in Miyakojima, with the main exports consisting of sugar cane, tobacco, cattle, and mango. Fisheries and seaweed farms, producing species such as mozuku and sea lettuce, can be found in and around areas like Ikemajima and Irabujima. However, each year more and more land formerly used for agriculture is being sold and converted into residential and retail buildings.

The tourism industry is a steadily growing component of Miyakojima's economy. Traveling to the islands is facilitated primarily through airlines and cruise lines. With the addition of international flights made available through the opening of Shimoji Airport in 2019, flights connecting to Miyako have been increasing – over 730,000 plane tickets entering into Miyakojima were purchased in 2019 alone. Since 2016 cruises have been a significant catalyst to Miyakojima's tourism industry, notably megaships servicing international tourists. Efforts to introduce space travel have also been announced, as PD Aerospace proposes to create a spaceport at Shimojijima airport and begin flights in 2025. The islands are popular tourist destinations because of the clear blue sea and white beaches. There are several golf clubs on the islands.

There are six breweries on the islands and a chemical plant that converts sugar cane into ethanol.

Facilities

Education 
There are a total of 3 high schools in the city, including one technical high school and one business high school.

There are 13 middle schools, including one that has been recently closed, and one special school for the intellectually disabled.

There are two schools that are both elementary and middle schools.

There are 15 elementary schools.

Medical 
There are two hospitals: one public, and one private.

Museum 
There is one museum, the Miyakojima City Museum.

Meeting venues 
There are five community centers, one municipal theater, a City Hall, three "Remote Island Promotion Centers" (one each for Ikemajima, Irabujima, and Kurimajima), and three "Rural Environment Improvement Centers".

Gymnasium/Athletic Center 
There are two gymnasiums, three baseball fields, three other athletic fields, and two "physical education centers".

Transportation

Airports 
There are two airports: Miyako Airport and Shimojishima Airport.

Ports 
There are four ports:

 Hirara Port (central port)
 Kuruma Port
 Sarahama Port (on Irabujima)
 Nagayama Port (on Irabujima)

Most boat travel takes place between one of the ports and Futenma port on the Island of Okinawa. There is also travel between Miyako Island and Ogamijima, the only island that is not connected by bridge.

Roads 

Part of Japanese National Highway 390 runs across the island. The highway consists of two sections: a section that transverses Ishigaki Island, and the section that transverses Miyako Island. The two sections used to be connected by boat, but boat service was discontinued and now the two sections of the highway are disconnected.

Numerous prefectural roads traverse the islands.

Bus 
Bus services are provided by four bus operators, that service a total of nine lines:

 Miyako Kyoei Bus (route from Miyakojima to Kurimajima)
 Yachiyo Bus (route from Miyakojima to Ikemajima)
 Kyowa Bus (from Miyakojima to Irabujima)
 Chuo Kotsu (from Miyakojima to Shimojishima)

Media

Newspapers 
There are two major newspapers in the city:

 Miyako Mainichi Shimbun
 Miyako Shinpo

Broadcast 

 SInce 2018, FM Okinawa can be received in the city.
 Miyako TV (Cable TV): Opened as Miyakojima Cable TV in 1978.
 There are FM relay stations of Ryukyu Broadcasting (RBCi Radio) and Radio Okinawa (ROK). 
 Until 1992, commercial TV could not be broadcast live in the city because there was no relay station (broadcast had to be recorded and then broadcast with a delay). After the relay station opened, Miyako TV began broadcasting commercial TV. 
 Miyako Television has the Nippon Television Network and the transmission equipment of TV Asahi.

Communication

Mail 
Mail collection and delivery is handled by the Miyako Post Office. There are several other smaller post offices that people use to drop off mail.

Phone 
The entire city has the same area code: 0980 (since 2002).

Climate

The climate of Miyakojima is on the boundary between a tropical rainforest climate (Köppen climate classification Af) and a humid subtropical climate (Köppen climate classification Cfa) with very warm summers and mild winters. Precipitation is abundant throughout the year; August is the wettest month, and January and July are the driest.

Environmental initiatives 

In 2008, the city announced the first "Declaration of Eco Island Miyakojima" with a goal to encourage industrial development and environmental conservation, notably of ground water sources and coral reefs. This initiative was also focused on creating a self-sustaining energy supply primarily through low-cost solar energy.

As of 2009, the city has been certified as an Eco-Model City. A second version of the Declaration of Eco Island Miyakojima was introduced under the slogan "Toward the Future 1,000 Years From Now" in 2018, with an action plan released in 2019. This updated version maintains similar goals with some added initiatives such as the eradication of foreign animal species, namely peacocks, and the reduction of household waste discharge. Under this second declaration, a greater emphasis has been placed on the promotion of these environmental initiatives through actions such as the establishment of an Eco Island Miyakojima brand, the creation of a contests, and the integration of environmental sustainability education into local public schools.

In 2019, the city was awarded a gold medal, also known as the Ministry of Economy Trade and Industry Prize, in the New Energy Awards for its efforts in proliferating solar energy throughout the island.

German influence

In 1873, the German ship Robertson was shipwrecked on Miyako Island. The crew were saved and cared for by the local islanders. As a gift for the islanders' kindness, and as an excuse for German warships to enter Ryūkyūan waters, Kaiser Wilhelm I erected a monument on the island in 1876, known locally as the German Emperor's Tributary Monument or the Friendship Monument. After Japan annexed the Ryūkyū Kingdom, Japan used this as evidence of a history of friendship between Japan and Germany.

In 1987, the Ueno German Culture Village opened in Ueno village, Miyako. Internet websites under the name Ueno German Cultural Village can be easily found, however Ueno Village, Miyako Island, no longer exists as a jurisdiction since, as mentioned above, all of the separate cities, towns and villages on the island were merged into Miyakojima city in 2005.

Sister cities

In Japan 

 Muroran, Hokkaido (since 1998)
 Nishiaizu, Yama, Fukushima
 Joetsu, Niigata
 Setagaya Ward, Tokyo (since 1962)
 Fujieda, Shizuoka (since 2011)
 Shirakawa, Gifu
 Tsuyama, Okayama
 Naruto, Tokushima (since 2003)
 Shirakawa, Kamo, Gifu (since 2004)

Outside Japan 

 Maui County, Hawaii, U.S. (since 1965)
 Keelung City, Taiwan (since 2007)

Notable residents 
Hideki Irabu, baseball player
Katsuyoshi Tomori, golfer
Kazumasa Uesato, footballer
Masanobu Kikukawa, martial artist
Mikio Shimoji, politician

Gallery

References

External links

 Miyakojima City official website 

 
Cities in Okinawa Prefecture
Port settlements in Japan
Populated coastal places in Japan
Environmental model cities